David Knight (born July 9, 1969) is an American politician who has served in the Georgia House of Representatives since 2005.

References

1969 births
Living people
Republican Party members of the Georgia House of Representatives
21st-century American politicians